Fabiola Boulanger (born August 10, 1978) is a French Canadian professional female bodybuilder born and raised in Repentigny, Quebec.

Personal life 
In addition to bodybuilding, she is an orthotherapist and a private trainer. Boulanger's first language is French.

Bodybuilding career 
After winning the 2011 CBBF Canadian Nationals, Boulanger was awarded her IFBB pro card, but in 2013, she announced her retirement from bodybuilding. That same year, she participated in the Toronto Pro as a physique competitor.

Contest history
 1999 - Pro Gym Cup - 1st
 2009 - Quebec de l'Ouest Championships - 1st
 2009 - Provincial Championships - 1st
 2010 – CBBF Canadian Nationals - 2nd
 2011 – CBBF Canadian Nationals - 1st

References

External links
 Official website
 Youtube account
 Twitter account
 Facebook account

1978 births
Canadian female bodybuilders
Living people
People from Repentigny, Quebec
Professional bodybuilders